Abel Fernando Miglietti (born 4 March 1946 in Maputo) is a former Portuguese footballer who played as forward.

He is the younger brother of Zeca.

International career 

Abel gained 4 caps for Portugal and made his debut 10 May 1972 in Nicosia against Cyprus, in a 1-0 win.

External links 
 
 

1946 births
Living people
Portuguese footballers
Association football forwards
Primeira Liga players
S.L. Benfica footballers
FC Porto players
S.C. Beira-Mar players
F.C. Penafiel players
Portugal international footballers
People from Maputo
Colonial people in Mozambique
20th-century Portuguese people
21st-century Portuguese people